Lorena Abicht (born 12 July 1994) is an Austrian sailor. She competed in the 49er FX event at the 2020 Summer Olympics, finishing 17th.

References

External links
 

1994 births
Living people
Austrian female sailors (sport)
Olympic sailors of Austria
Sailors at the 2020 Summer Olympics – 49er FX
Place of birth missing (living people)
20th-century Austrian women
21st-century Austrian women